Eyes Right! is a 1926 American silent drama film directed by Louis Chaudet and starring Francis X. Bushman Jr., Florence Fair and Dora Dean.

Cast
 Francis X. Bushman Jr. as Ted Winters 
 Florence Fair as Betty Phillips 
 Dora Dean as Alice Murdock 
 Larry Kent as Maj. Snodgrass 
 Frederick Vroom as Col. Thomas A. Davis 
 Robert Hale as Lt. Smith

References

Bibliography
 Munden, Kenneth White. The American Film Institute Catalog of Motion Pictures Produced in the United States, Part 1. University of California Press, 1997.

External links

1926 films
1926 drama films
Silent American drama films
Films directed by Louis Chaudet
American silent feature films
1920s English-language films
American black-and-white films
1920s American films